The  P&H L-2350 Wheel Loader (formerly the L-2350 loader) is a loader used for surface mining. It is manufactured by Komatsu Limited. It holds the Guinness World Record for Biggest Earth Mover. Designed to center-load haul trucks with capacities of up to 400 tons, the L-2350 provides an operating payload of 160,000 pounds or 80 tons, a 24-foot lift height, and an 11.5-foot reach.

History
The L-2350 was originally manufactured by LeTourneau Inc., LeTourneau Inc. was acquired by Marathon in 1972, Rowan Companies in 1986, and Joy Global in 2011.

Joy Global renamed the equipment as the P&H L-2350.

Specifications
 Operational weight 260 tons
 2300 Horsepower
 16 Cylinder 65.0 Litre Detroit Diesel 4-cycle Turbocharged Aftercooler Engine (2300 hp) or 16 cylinder 60.0 Litre Cummins Diesel 4-cycle Turbocharged Aftercooler Engine (2300 hp)
 Hydraulic lifting payload 72 tons
 Standard Bucket 40,52 m³ (53.0 yd³)**
 Fuel Tank 3974.68 Litre (1050.0 US liquid Gal)**
 Hydraulic Oil 1230 Litre (324.93 US liquid Gal)**
 Tyres 70/70-57 SRG DT (diameter 4 m and width 1.78 m) [d=13.12 ft & w=5.84 ft]**

 Cost $1.5M (2012)

See also
Diesel-electric transmission

References

Engineering vehicles
Wheeled vehicles